Nguyễn Cao Kỳ Duyên (born 30 June 1965) is a Vietnamese-American singer, songwriter, and master of ceremonies, notably co-hosting the Paris by Night series.

Early life
Kỳ Duyên was born on June 30, 1965, in Saigon, South Vietnam as the only daughter to Nguyễn Cao Kỳ, a former South Vietnamese Prime Minister, Vice President, and Air-Force General. Her mother is Đặng Tuyết Mai who was from Bắc Ninh and spent most of her childhood in Hanoi. In 1953, she and her family moved to Da Lat, South Vienam, where Đặng Tuyết Mai studied at Yersin High School, acquiring fluency in English and French. Before getting married, she was one of four air hostesses for Air Vietnam. Đặng Tuyết Mai met Nguyễn Cao Kỳ on a trip from Manila to Vietnam. At around the age of ten during the Fall of Saigon on April 30, 1975, Nguyễn Cao Kỳ Duyên moved to the United States.

When first moving to America, Nguyễn Cao Kỳ Duyên lived in Fairfax, Virginia, then later moved to Huntington Beach, California in which she studied at Marina High School. She enrolled for a law major at Western State College of Law at Argosy University and graduated with honors.

She learned piano since age 5. During the time when she was 13 to 19 years old, she learned music theory and vocal training. Her debut appearance was to host at Miss Ao Dai Competition in Long Beach, California. In 1984, she recorded her first music CD at Tung Giang Studio. In 1985, she debuted as a singer in Seattle, Washington, but her first recording was in 1993 for Hollywood Night Center. She often performs at Las Vegas, California and Paris.

Kỳ Duyên is currently a master of ceremonies for Thúy Nga Productions's Paris by Night series alongside Nguyễn Ngọc Ngạn. Kỳ Duyên has shared that when she first began her career as an MC, she did not read and write in Vietnamese, so her mother helped her memorize her lines.

Education
Kỳ Duyên went to school in Fairfax, Virginia during her childhood, moving to Huntington Beach, California in her high school years, and graduating from Westminster High School in Westminster, California.

She received her Bachelor of Undergraduate Education degree at California State Polytechnic University, and later obtained her Graduate Law master's degree with Honors from Western State University College of Law.

Personal life
Her first marriage was to Nguyễn Quang Li, a surgeon, then Trịnh Hội, a lawyer (whom she divorced in 2008). Following two marriages and two divorces, she fell in love with David Duy Han, a financial analyst and writer. She currently resides in Huntington Beach, California with her two daughters from her first marriage.

References

External links

Official website

Interview with Nguyễn Cao Kỳ Duyên Los Angeles Times, 2004
Interview with Nguyễn Cao Kỳ Duyên
Vagifirm product by Nguyễn Cao Kỳ Duyên
Mc Nguyễn Cao Kỳ Duyên trẻ lại kỳ lạ và sự thật phía sau

1965 births
Living people
Vietnamese emigrants to the United States
American women pop singers
American women singer-songwriters
Western State University College of Law alumni
California State Polytechnic University, Pomona alumni
People from Ho Chi Minh City
American women record producers
American singer-songwriters
Thuy Nga Productions
Vietnamese Buddhists
American Buddhists